Woody Stephens (September 1, 1913 – August 22, 1998) was an American Thoroughbred horse racing Hall of Fame trainer.

Biography
Born Woodford Cefis Stephens in Stanton, Kentucky, he had a  younger brother named William Ward Stephens who also became a successful trainer. Woody Stephens started in racing as a jockey at age 16 but within a few years switched to training horses. After working as an assistant for several years, in the late 1930s he started training on his own, taking on horses from various owners. Near the end of the 1950s, he was hired by the wealthy Harry Guggenheim as head trainer for his Cain Hoy Stable. The move proved very successful, with Stephens training several champions and winning a number of major stakes races, including the Kentucky Oaks three times. He remained with the Guggenheim operation for ten years before returning to run his own stable again in 1966.

In a career that spanned seven decades, Stephens trained eleven Eclipse Award winners, and his horses won over a hundred Grade 1 stakes races. Among his most notable horses was Henryk de Kwiatkowski's colt Conquistador Cielo, the winner of the 1982 Eclipse Award for Horse of the Year. Although Stephens trained horses that won the Kentucky Oaks for fillies five times, plus the Kentucky Derby twice and the Preakness Stakes once, he is most remembered  for winning an unprecedented five straight Belmont Stakes from 1982 to 1986.

Stephens was elected to the National Museum of Racing and Hall of Fame in 1976. In 1983, he won the Eclipse Award as the top trainer in the United States. Although he often wore rumpled clothes, his earnings from racing plus investments in successful breeding stock made him a very wealthy man. In 1985 Doubleday published Guess I'm Lucky, an autobiography he wrote with James Brough.

Personal life, death
Stephens was a resident of Midway, Kentucky, where he started his work with Thoroughbred horses. He died in 1998 in Miami Lakes, Florida, from complications of chronic emphysema 10 days shy of his 85th birthday.

Awards
U.S. Triple Crown race winners
Kentucky Derby:
1974  :  Cannonade
1984  :  Swale
Preakness Stakes:
1952  :  Blue Man
Belmont Stakes:
1982  :  Conquistador Cielo
1983  :  Caveat
1984  :  Swale
1985  :  Creme Fraiche
1986  :  Danzig Connection

References

 Woody Stephens autobiography Guess I'm Lucky! My Life in Horseracing (1985) Doubleday 
 Woodford Stephens at the National Museum of Racing and Hall of Fame

1913 births
1998 deaths
American horse trainers
Eclipse Award winners
United States Thoroughbred Racing Hall of Fame inductees
People from Stanton, Kentucky